The editorial board is a group of experts, usually at a publication, who dictate the tone and direction the publication's editorial policy will take.

Mass media
At a newspaper, the editorial board usually consists of the editorial page editor, and editorial writers. Some newspapers include other personnel as well. Editorial boards for magazines may include experts in the subject area that the magazine focuses on, and larger magazines may have several editorial boards grouped by subject. An executive editorial board may oversee these subject boards, and usually includes the executive editor and representatives from the subject focus boards.

Editorial boards meet on a regular basis to discuss the latest news and opinion trends and discuss what the newspaper should say on a range of issues. They will then decide who will write what editorials and for what day. When such an editorial appears in a newspaper, it is considered the institutional opinion of that newspaper. At some newspapers, the editorial board will also review wire service and syndicated columns for inclusion on the editorial page or op-ed page. Some newspapers, particularly small ones, do not have an editorial board, choosing instead to rely on the judgment of a single editorial page editor.

Book and magazine publishers will often use their editorial boards to review or select manuscripts or articles, and sometimes to check facts. Book publishers may also make use of editorial boards, using subject experts to select manuscripts.

The editorial board meeting ran by Phyllis E. Grann at Putnam was called the "Thursday Morning Breakfast Meeting." The meeting was described in New York Magazine as, "8:30 event had a war-room atmosphere, with representatives of every department--editorial, publicity, sales and marketing--reporting in to Grann, who made decisions like a Mike Milken-style bond trader, constantly evaluation and re-evaluating her positions."

Academic journals
Almost all academic journals have an editorial board consisting of selected, unpaid experts in the academic field covered by a journal. This is almost always an honorary position, although board members sometimes provide peer review of submissions. A member may be asked to review several manuscripts per year and may edit a special issue. The members may also be consulted regarding new regulations at the journal. They are expected to promote the journal among their peers.

See also

References

External links

 Editorial Boards and the Public Interest by Clint Reilly

 Editorial Boards of Journal of Maize Research and Development
 http://nmrp.gov.np/journal-of-maize-research-and-development/editorial-board-jmrd/

Editing
Journalism occupations
Newspaper content
Publishing